New Lancaster is an unincorporated community in Madison Township, Tipton County, in the U.S. state of Indiana.

It is part of the Kokomo, Indiana, Metropolitan Statistical Area.

History
A post office was established at New Lancaster in 1847, and remained in operation until it was discontinued in 1903.

Geography

References

Unincorporated communities in Tipton County, Indiana
Unincorporated communities in Indiana
Kokomo, Indiana metropolitan area